Destiny's Dance is an album by American jazz saxophonist Chico Freeman recorded in 1981 and released on the Contemporary label.

Reception
The Allmusic review by Scott Yanow awarded the album 4 stars stating "By 1981, after six years of steady recording, Chico Freeman had gained a strong reputation as a flexible reed player able to play both avant-garde and fairly straight-ahead jazz".  The Penguin Guide to Jazz numbers it among the "core collection" which jazz fans should possess.

Track listing
All compositions by Chico Freeman except as indicated
 "Destiny's Dance" - 4:11  
 "Same Shame" (Bobby Hutcherson) - 5:37  
 "Crossing the Sudan" - 5:46  
 "Wilpan's Walk" (Cecil McBee) - 9:18  
 "Embracing Oneness" - 6:59  
 "C & M" (Muhal Richard Abrams, Freeman) - 4:21

Personnel
Chico Freeman - tenor saxophone, bass clarinet
Wynton Marsalis - trumpet (tracks 1, 3, 4 & 6)
Bobby Hutcherson - vibraphone
Dennis Moorman - piano (tracks 1, 4 & 6)
Cecil McBee - bass
Ronnie Burrage - drums
Paulinho Da Costa - percussion (track 4)

References 

Contemporary Records albums
Chico Freeman albums
1982 albums